"Keine Lust" (German for "no desire") is a song by German Neue Deutsche Härte band Rammstein. It was released as the fourth and final single from their fourth studio album, Reise, Reise (2004), on 28 February 2005 in Germany, Austria, and Switzerland as a maxi-single, a limited edition digipak single, a 7" vinyl single, a 12" vinyl single, and as a two-track.

Music video
The "Keine Lust" music video was filmed in January 2005 and premiered a month later. It depicts a reunion between Rammstein, whose members are visibly aged and morbidly obese, and their instruments are old and dusty. They arrive at an underground parking garage in luxurious white cars (a 1970 Rolls-Royce Silver Shadow, 1970 Cadillac Calais, 1968 Mercedes-Benz 600, 1997 Mercedes-Benz S-Class limo and a 1957 Bentley S1) driven by beautiful women in white clothes, who help them set up the instruments, and the band's clothes and instruments are also white. Only keyboardist Flake appears not to have gained any weight. He arrives in a motorized wheelchair, just in time to play the keyboard part of the song. At the end of the video, the rest of the band leaves, abandoning Flake who has managed to stand during the song and now cannot sit back down (or walk).

Drummer Christoph Schneider came up with the idea for the video and originally wanted the song to be released as the lead single from Reise, Reise; he enjoyed the idea of Rammstein coming back from a long break in between albums with a morbidly obese appearance. Though the band did use his idea for the video, the song was released as the fourth and final single from the album instead. Despite the music playing over the band's performance in the video, some guitar feedback that was picked up from the microphones was included in the final cut of the video, something that director Jörn Heitmann wanted to include. In the video The Making of Keine Lust, guitarist Richard Kruspe discussed the meaning of the song and music video:

"You know, after all of these years we're full-up!  Fame, success, money.  We don't want to do anything anymore!  Nothing!  That's the idea in the song.  We've returned to the starting point again.  We just want to make music again.  We don't want all the circus that goes with it anymore.  So, we meet up again, one more time, for one more performance – just to make music together.  The fact that we are fat is just symbolic for excess.  It's really just about returning to the beginning."

The video was nominated for Best Video at the MTV Europe Music Awards in November 2005. The second version of the music video pays tribute to the music videos by featuring women shooting flames from masks ("Feuer frei!") and flamethrowers and one woman flaming jackets ("Rammstein").

Live story
It was first played in three consecutive concerts for members of the fan club, in October 2004. In the formal tour, it was played in every concert. The band played the song in the Echo Awards 2005, dressed in the costumes used in the video. They even arrived on stage in the cars seen in the video. At first, "Keine Lust" was the only song from Reise, Reise in the Liebe Ist Für Alle Da tour setlist, except for "Amerika" which was played at one show, and "Mein Teil", which was reintroduced into the setlist later in the tour.

Track listing
German CD maxi single

Also released as a 2-track CD and Mini CD featuring "Keine Lust" and "Keine Lust (Remix No. 1)"

UK CD single

UK 7" vinyl single

12" vinyl single

UK DVD single

Charts

References

External links
 Keine Lust music video

Rammstein songs
2005 singles
2004 songs
Songs written by Richard Z. Kruspe
Songs written by Paul Landers
Songs written by Till Lindemann
Songs written by Christian Lorenz
Songs written by Oliver Riedel
Songs written by Christoph Schneider